Susan Gantman is a senior judge and President Judge Emeritus of the Pennsylvania Superior Court.  She was elected in 2003 and took office January 5, 2004. She was retained in 2013, served as President Judge from 2014 to 2019, and took senior status in 2020. She was in private practice from 1981 to 2004 and served as a Law Clerk in the Montgomery County Court of Common Pleas from 1977 to 1978. She earned her J.D. from the Villanova University School of Law in 1977 and her B.A./M.A. from the University of Pennsylvania in 1974.

References

Living people
Judges of the Superior Court of Pennsylvania
Year of birth missing (living people)